Legionella lytica is a Gram-negative bacterium from the genus Legionella.

References

Legionellales
Bacteria described in 1996